Jana Linke-Sippl (born March 16, 1968) is a FBB female bodybuilder from Austria and a session mixed wrestler. Originally from Germany, Linke-Sippl lives in the US and Graz. Her height is 171 cm and her weight is 102 kg. She has been interviewed and has frequently appeared on European TV Channels such as RTL.

Personal life 
Linke-Sippl was born in Neustadt an der Orla, a little town in Thuringia, East Germany. She gained her interest in bodybuilding after she moved to West Germany. After just 16 months of training, Linke-Sippl took part in the 1991 IFFB competition. Linke-Sippl had breast surgery in December 2008.

Contest history 
2005 International Austria Cup - 1st
Master's World Championship (Budapest)
Europa Pro Show 5th place                     (2007)
Upper Bavarian/Swabian championship 1st place (2003)

References

External links 
 

Austrian female bodybuilders
Professional bodybuilders
German female bodybuilders
1968 births
Living people